Varronia is a genus of flowering plants in the family Boraginaceae, found throughout Latin America (except Chile and Patagonia), the Caribbean, and in the US states of Texas and Florida. They were resurrected from Cordia in 2007.

Species
Currently accepted species include:

Varronia acunae Moldenke
Varronia acuta (Pittier) Borhidi
Varronia ambigua (Schltdl. & Cham.) Borhidi
Varronia andreana (Estrada) J.S.Mill.
Varronia anisodonta (Urb.) Borhidi
Varronia areolata (Urb.) Friesen
Varronia axillaris (I.M.Johnst.) Borhidi
Varronia badaeva (Urb. & Ekman) Borhidi
Varronia bahamensis (Urb.) Millsp.
Varronia baracoensis (Urb.) Borhidi
Varronia barahonensis (Urb.) Friesen
Varronia bellonis (Urb.) Britton
Varronia bombardensis (Urb. & Ekman) Borhidi
Varronia bonplandii Desv.
Varronia braceliniae (I.M.Johnst.) Borhidi
Varronia bridgesii Friesen
Varronia brittonii Millsp.
Varronia brownei (Friesen) Borhidi
Varronia buddleoides (Rusby) J.S.Mill.
Varronia bullata L.
Varronia bullulata (Killip ex J.Estrada & García-Barr.) J.S.Mill.
Varronia calcicola (Urb.) Borhidi
Varronia calocephala (Cham.) Friesen
Varronia campestris (Warm.) Borhidi
Varronia candolleana Borhidi
Varronia canescens Andersson
Varronia caput-medusae (Taub.) Friesen
Varronia chabrensis (Urb. & Ekman) Borhidi
Varronia cinerascens (A.DC.) Borhidi
Varronia clarendonensis Britton
Varronia claviceps (Urb. & Ekman) Borhidi
Varronia corallicola (Urb.) Borhidi
Varronia corchorifolia (A.DC.) Borhidi
Varronia cremersii (Feuillet) Feuillet
Varronia crenata Ruiz & Pav.
Varronia curassavica Jacq.
Varronia cylindrostachya Ruiz & Pav.
Varronia dardanoi (Taroda) J.S.Mill.
Varronia dependens (Urb. & Ekman) Borhidi
Varronia dichotoma Ruiz & Pav.
Varronia discolor (Cham.) Borhidi
Varronia duartei (Borhidi & O.Muñiz) Borhidi
Varronia eggersii (K.Krause) J.S.Mill.
Varronia erythrococca (Griseb.) Moldenke
Varronia exarata (Urb.) Borhidi
Varronia fasciata (Leonard & Alain) Borhidi
Varronia fasciculata (Urb. & Ekman) Borhidi
Varronia foliosa (M.Martens & Galeotti) Borhidi
Varronia gibberosa (Urb. & Ekman) Borhidi
Varronia glandulosa (Fresen.) Borhidi
Varronia globosa Jacq.
Varronia gonavensis Borhidi
Varronia grandiflora Desv.
Varronia grisebachii (Urb.) Moldenke
Varronia guanacastensis (Standl.) J.S.Mill.
Varronia guaranitica (Chodat & Hassl.) J.S.Mill.
Varronia haitiensis (Urb.) Borhidi
Varronia harleyi (Taroda) J.S.Mill.
Varronia holguinensis (Borhidi & O.Muñiz) Borhidi
Varronia iberica (Urb.) Borhidi
Varronia inermis (Mill.) Borhidi
Varronia integrifolia Desv.
Varronia intricata (C.Wright) Borhidi ex Feuillet
Varronia jamaicensis (I.M.Johnst.) Borhidi
Varronia jeremiensis (Urb. & Ekman) Borhidi
Varronia johnstoniana J.I.M.Melo & D.D.Vieira
Varronia krauseana (Killip) J.S.Mill.
Varronia lamprophylla (Urb.) Borhidi
Varronia lanceolata Desv.
Varronia lantanifolia J.S.Mill. & J.R.I.Wood
Varronia lauta (I.M.Johnst.) J.S.Mill.
Varronia lenis (Alain) Borhidi
Varronia leptoclada (Urb. & Britton) Millsp.
Varronia leucocephala (Moric.) J.S.Mill.
Varronia leucomalla (Taub.) Borhidi
Varronia leucomalloides (Taroda) J.S.Mill.
Varronia leucophlyctis (Hook.f.) Andersson
Varronia lima Desv.
Varronia limicola (Brandegee) Friesen
Varronia linnaei (Stearn) J.S.Mill.
Varronia lippioides (I.M.Johnst.) J.S.Mill.
Varronia longipedunculata Britton & P.Wilson
Varronia lucayana Millsp.
Varronia macrocephala Desv.
Varronia macrodonta (Killip) J.S.Mill.
Varronia martinicensis Jacq.
Varronia mayoi (Taroda) M.Stapf
Varronia microphylla Desv.
Varronia moensis Moldenke
Varronia mollissima (Killip) Borhidi
Varronia multicapitata (Britton ex Rusby) J.S.Mill.
Varronia multispicata (Cham.) Borhidi
Varronia munda (I.M.Johnst.) J.S.Mill.
Varronia nashii (Urb. & Britton) Borhidi
Varronia neowediana (A.DC.) Borhidi
Varronia nesophila (I.M.Johnst.) Borhidi
Varronia nipensis (Urb. & Ekman) Borhidi
Varronia nivea (Fresen.) Borhidi
Varronia oaxacana (A.DC.) Friesen
Varronia oligodonta (Urb.) Borhidi
Varronia paucidentata (Fresen.) Friesen
Varronia pedunculosa (Griseb.) Borhidi
Varronia perroyana (Urb. & Ekman) Borhidi
Varronia peruviana (Roem. & Schult.) Borhidi
Varronia picardae (Urb.) Borhidi
Varronia podocephala (Torr.) Borhidi ex G.Campos & F.Chiang
Varronia poliophylla (Fresen.) Borhidi
Varronia polycephala Lam.
Varronia polystachya (Kunth) Borhidi
Varronia portoricensis (Spreng.) Feuillet
Varronia revoluta (Hook.f.) Andersson
Varronia roraimae (I.M.Johnst.) J.S.Mill.
Varronia rosei (Killip) Borhidi
Varronia rupicola (Urb.) Britton
Varronia salviifolia (Juss. ex Poir.) Borhidi
Varronia sangrinaria (Gaviria) J.S.Mill.
Varronia sauvallei (Urb.) Borhidi
Varronia schomburgkii (A.DC.) Borhidi
Varronia scouleri (Hook.f.) Andersson
Varronia selleana (Urb.) Friesen
Varronia serrata (L.) Borhidi
Varronia sessilifolia (Cham.) Borhidi
Varronia setigera (I.M.Johnst.) J.S.Mill.
Varronia shaferi Britton
Varronia spinescens (L.) Borhidi
Varronia stellata (Greenm.) Borhidi
Varronia stenostachya (Killip ex Gaviria) J.S.Mill.
Varronia steyermarkii (Gaviria) J.S.Mill.
Varronia striata (Fresen.) Borhidi
Varronia subtruncata (Rusby) Friesen
Varronia suffruticosa (Borhidi) Borhidi
Varronia toaensis (Borhidi & O.Muñiz) Borhidi
Varronia tomentosa Lam.
Varronia truncata (Fresen.) Borhidi
Varronia utermarkiana (Borhidi) Borhidi
Varronia vargasii J.S.Mill.
Varronia vasqueziana J.S.Mill.
Varronia wagnerorum (R.A.Howard) Borhidi

References

Boraginaceae
Boraginaceae genera